Asiatic striped squirrels are a genus (Tamiops) of squirrels (Sciuridae) in the subfamily Callosciurinae. They are small striped arboreal squirrels from Asia. Their head to body length measured from 10 to 13 cm. They often are confused with other squirrels (e.f. Funambulus or Tamias). In contrast to these other squirrels, they have smaller rounded ears with white-tipped hairs. A black longitudinal stripe is present in the middle of the back, which is parallel on both sides with two pairs of pale longitudinal stripes. These pale stripes are separated by dark brownish stripes. In some countries, they are kept as pets.

The four species of Asiatic striped squirrels are:
Himalayan striped squirrel, T. mcclellandii
Maritime striped squirrel, T. maritimus
Cambodian striped squirrel, T. rodolphii
Swinhoe's striped squirrel, T. swinhoei

Asiatic striped squirrels can be identified by the differences in the stripe pattern. For example, in some species, the stripe of the cheek interrupts in the shoulder region and does not continue to the outermost pale stripe.

References

 
Taxa named by Joel Asaph Allen